The Atlantic Coast Conference women's basketball Player of the Year is a basketball award given to the women's basketball player in the Atlantic Coast Conference (ACC) voted as the most outstanding player. It has been presented since the 1983–84, by the Atlantic Coast Sports Media Association. The award was first given to Tresa Brown of North Carolina.

Two players have won the award three times: Alana Beard of Duke and Alyssa Thomas of Maryland.

Duke has the most winners with 8 all-time.

Key

Winners

Winners by school

Footnotes
The "Class" column refers to United States terminology indicating that student's year of athletic eligibility, which usually (but not always) corresponds to the year of study. For example, a freshman is in his first year (of four) of eligibility, followed by sophomore, junior and senior.
The University of Maryland left the ACC to join the Big Ten in 2014.

References

NCAA Division I women's basketball conference players of the year
Player of the Year
Awards established in 1984